Arnold Alois Schwarzenegger (born July 30, 1947) is an Austrian and American actor, businessman, filmmaker, retired professional bodybuilder and politician who served as the 38th governor of California between 2003 and 2011. Time magazine named Schwarzenegger one of the 100 most influential people in the world in 2004 and 2007.

Schwarzenegger began lifting weights at the age of 15 and went on to win the Mr. Universe title at age 20 and subsequently won the Mr. Olympia title seven times. He is widely regarded as one of the greatest bodybuilders of all time, and has written many books and articles about bodybuilding. The Arnold Sports Festival, considered the second-most important bodybuilding event after Mr. Olympia, is named after him. He appeared in the bodybuilding documentary Pumping Iron (1977). Schwarzenegger retired from bodybuilding and gained worldwide fame as a Hollywood action star, with his breakthrough in the sword and sorcery epic Conan the Barbarian (1982), a box-office hit with a sequel in 1984. After playing the title character in the science fiction film The Terminator (1984), he starred in the sequels Terminator 2: Judgment Day (1991), Terminator 3: Rise of the Machines (2003), Terminator Genisys (2015), and Terminator: Dark Fate (2019). His other successful action films included Commando (1985), The Running Man (1987), Predator (1987), Red Heat (1988), Total Recall (1990), and True Lies (1994), in addition to comedy films such as Twins (1988), Kindergarten Cop (1990), Junior (1994), and Jingle All the Way (1996). He is the founder of the film production company Oak Productions.

As a Republican candidate, Schwarzenegger was first elected on October 7, 2003, in a special recall election to replace then-Governor Gray Davis. He received 48.6% of the vote, 17 points ahead of Democrat runner-up Cruz Bustamante. He was sworn in on November 17 to serve the remainder of Davis' term, and was re-elected in the 2006 California gubernatorial election with an increased vote share of 55.9% to serve a full term as governor. In 2011, he reached his term limit as governor and returned to acting.

Schwarzenegger was nicknamed the "Austrian Oak" in his bodybuilding days, "Arnie" or "Schwarzy" during his acting career, and "the Governator" (a portmanteau of "Governor" and "Terminator") during his political career. He married Maria Shriver, a niece of President John F. Kennedy, in 1986. They separated in 2011 after he admitted to having fathered a child with their housemaid in 1997; their divorce was finalized in 2021.

Early life 

Arnold Alois Schwarzenegger was born in Thal on July 30, 1947, the second son of Gustav Schwarzenegger and his wife, Aurelia (née Jadrny). Schwarzenegger's father was the local chief of police. After the Anschluss in 1938, he joined the Nazi Party and, in 1939 the Sturmabteilung (SA). In World War II, he served as a military policeman in the invasions of Poland, France and the Soviet Union, including the siege of Leningrad, rising to the rank of Hauptfeldwebel. He was wounded in the Battle of Stalingrad, and was discharged in 1943 following a bout of malaria. According to Holocaust scholar Michael Berenbaum, Gustav Schwarzenegger served "in theaters of the war where atrocities were committed. But there is no way to know from the documents whether he played a role." Gustav's background received wide press attention during the 2003 California gubernatorial recall election in which Schwarzenegger was elected governor.

Gustav Schwarzenegger married Aurelia on October 20, 1945; he was 38 and she was 23. According to Schwarzenegger, his parents were very strict: "Back then in Austria it was a very different world [...] if we did something bad or we disobeyed our parents, the rod was not spared." He grew up in a Catholic family. Gustav preferred his elder son, Meinhard, over Arnold. His favoritism was "strong and blatant", which stemmed from unfounded suspicion that Arnold was not his biological child. Schwarzenegger has said that his father had "no patience for listening or understanding your problems". He had a good relationship with his mother, with whom he kept in touch until her death.

Early education and bodybuilding beginnings 

At school, Schwarzenegger was reportedly academically average but stood out for his "cheerful, good-humored, and exuberant" character. Money was a problem in their household; Schwarzenegger recalled that one of the highlights of his youth was when the family bought a refrigerator. Schwarzenegger's father Gustav was an athlete, and wished for his sons to become a champion in Bavarian curling. Influenced by his father, Schwarzenegger played several sports as a boy.

Schwarzenegger began weight training in 1960 when his football coach took his team to a local gym. At the age of 14, he chose bodybuilding over football as a career. He later said, "I actually started weight training when I was 15, but I'd been participating in sports, like soccer, for years, so I felt that although I was slim, I was well-developed, at least enough so that I could start going to the gym and start Olympic lifting." However, his official website biography claims that "at 14, he started an intensive training program with Dan Farmer, studied psychology at 15 (to learn more about the power of mind over body) and at 17, officially started his competitive career." During a speech in 2001, he said, "My own plan formed when I was 14 years old. My father had wanted me to be a police officer like he was. My mother wanted me to go to trade school."

Schwarzenegger took to visiting a gym in Graz, where he also frequented the local movie theaters to see bodybuilding idols such as Reg Park, Steve Reeves, and Johnny Weissmuller on the big screen. When Reeves died in 2000, Schwarzenegger fondly remembered him: "As a teenager, I grew up with Steve Reeves. His remarkable accomplishments allowed me a sense of what was possible when others around me didn't always understand my dreams. Steve Reeves has been part of everything I've ever been fortunate enough to achieve." In 1961, Schwarzenegger met former Mr. Austria Kurt Marnul, who invited him to train at the gym in Graz. He was so dedicated as a youngster that he broke into the local gym on weekends in order to train even when it was closed. "It would make me sick to miss a workout... I knew I couldn't look at myself in the mirror the next morning if I didn't do it." When Schwarzenegger was asked about his first cinema experience as a boy, he replied: "I was very young, but I remember my father taking me to the Austrian theaters and seeing some newsreels. The first real movie I saw, that I distinctly remember, was a John Wayne movie." In Graz, Schwarzenegger was mentored by Alfred Gerstl, who had Jewish ancestry and later became president of the Federal Council, and befriended his son Karl.

Schwarzenegger's brother, Meinhard, died in a car crash on May 20, 1971. He was driving drunk and died instantly. Schwarzenegger did not attend his funeral. Meinhard was engaged to Erika Knapp, and they had a three-year-old son named Patrick. Schwarzenegger paid for Patrick's education and helped him to move to the U.S. Gustav died of a stroke on December 13, 1972. In Pumping Iron, Schwarzenegger claimed that he did not attend his father's funeral because he was training for a bodybuilding contest. Later, he and the film's producer said this story was taken from another bodybuilder to show the extremes some would go to for their sport and to make Schwarzenegger's image colder to create controversy for the film. However, Barbara Baker, his first serious girlfriend, recalled that he informed her of his father's death without emotion and that he never spoke of his brother. Over time, he has given at least three versions of why he was absent from his father's funeral.

In an interview with Fortune in 2004, Schwarzenegger told how he suffered what "would now be called child abuse" at the hands of his father: "My hair was pulled. I was hit with belts. So was the kid next door. It was just the way it was. Many of the children I've seen were broken by their parents, which was the German-Austrian mentality. They didn't want to create an individual. It was all about conforming. I was one who did not conform, and whose will could not be broken. Therefore, I became a rebel. Every time I got hit, and every time someone said, 'You can't do this,' I said, 'This is not going to be for much longer because I'm going to move out of here. I want to be rich. I want to be somebody.'"

Schwarzenegger served in the Austrian Army in 1965 to fulfill the one year of service required at the time of all 18-year-old Austrian males. During his army service, he won the Junior Mr. Europe contest. He went AWOL during basic training so he could take part in the competition and then spent a week in military prison: "Participating in the competition meant so much to me that I didn't carefully think through the consequences." He entered another bodybuilding contest in Graz, at Steirerhof Hotel, where he placed second. He was voted "best-built man of Europe", which made him famous in bodybuilding circles. "The Mr. Universe title was my ticket to America—the land of opportunity, where I could become a star and get rich." Schwarzenegger made his first plane trip in 1966, attending the NABBA Mr. Universe competition in London. He placed second in the Mr. Universe competition, not having the muscle definition of American winner Chester Yorton.

Charles "Wag" Bennett, one of the judges at the 1966 competition, was impressed with Schwarzenegger and he offered to coach him. As Schwarzenegger had little money, Bennett invited him to stay in his crowded family home above one of his two gyms in Forest Gate, London. Yorton's leg definition had been judged superior, and Schwarzenegger, under a training program devised by Bennett, concentrated on improving the muscle definition and power in his legs. Staying in the East End of London helped Schwarzenegger improve his rudimentary grasp of the English language. Living with the Bennetts also changed him as a person: "Being with them made me so much more sophisticated. When you're the age I was then, you're always looking for approval, for love, for attention and also for guidance. At the time, I wasn't really aware of that. But now, looking back, I see that the Bennett family fulfilled all those needs. Especially my need to be the best in the world. To be recognized and to feel unique and special. They saw that I needed that care and attention and love."

Also in 1966, while at Bennett's home, Schwarzenegger had the opportunity to meet childhood idol Reg Park, who became his friend and mentor. The training paid off and, in 1967, Schwarzenegger won the title for the first time, becoming the youngest ever Mr. Universe at the age of 20. He would go on to win the title a further three times. Schwarzenegger then flew back to Munich, where he attended a business school and worked in a health club (Rolf Putziger's gym, where he worked and trained from 1966 to 1968), returning in 1968 to London to win his next Mr. Universe title. He frequently told Roger C. Field, his English coach and friend in Munich at that time, "I'm going to become the greatest actor!"

Schwarzenegger, who dreamed of moving to the U.S. since the age of 10, and saw bodybuilding as the avenue through which to do so, realized his dream by moving to the United States in October 1968 at the age of 21, speaking little English. There he trained at Gold's Gym in Venice, Los Angeles, California, under Joe Weider's supervision. From 1970 to 1974, one of Schwarzenegger's weight training partners was Ric Drasin, a professional wrestler who designed the original Gold's Gym logo in 1973. Schwarzenegger also became good friends with professional wrestler Superstar Billy Graham. In 1970, at age 23, he captured his first Mr. Olympia title in New York, and would go on to win the title a total of seven times.

The immigration law firm Siskind & Susser has stated that Schwarzenegger may have been an illegal immigrant at some point in the late 1960s or early 1970s because of violations in the terms of his visa. LA Weekly would later say in 2002 that Schwarzenegger is the most famous immigrant in the United States, who "overcame a thick Austrian accent and transcended the unlikely background of bodybuilding to become the biggest movie star in the world in the 1990s".

In 1977, Schwarzenegger's autobiography/weight-training guide Arnold: The Education of a Bodybuilder became a huge success. In 1977, he posed for the gay magazine After Dark. Due to taking an assortment of courses at Santa Monica College in California (including English classes), as well as further upper division classes at the University of California, Los Angeles as part of UCLA's extension program, Schwarzenegger had by then accumulated enough credits so as to be "within striking distance" of graduation. In 1979, he enrolled in the University of Wisconsin–Superior as a distance education student, completing most of his coursework by correspondence and flying out to Superior to meet professors and take final exams. In May 1980, he formally graduated and received his bachelor's degree in business administration and marketing. He received his United States citizenship in 1983.

He would later be awarded an Honorary Degree from Stockton University in 2023.

Bodybuilding career 

Schwarzenegger is considered among the most important figures in the history of bodybuilding, and his legacy is commemorated in the Arnold Classic annual bodybuilding competition. He has remained a prominent face in bodybuilding long after his retirement, in part because of his ownership of gyms and fitness magazines. He has presided over numerous contests and awards shows.

For many years, he wrote a monthly column for the bodybuilding magazines Muscle & Fitness and Flex. Shortly after being elected governor, he was appointed the executive editor of both magazines, in a largely symbolic capacity. The magazines agreed to donate $250,000 a year to the Governor's various physical fitness initiatives. When the deal, including the contract that gave Schwarzenegger at least $1 million a year, was made public in 2005, many criticized it as being a conflict of interest since the governor's office made decisions concerning regulation of dietary supplements in California. Consequently, Schwarzenegger relinquished the executive editor role in 2005. American Media Inc., which owns Muscle & Fitness and Flex, announced in March 2013 that Schwarzenegger had accepted their renewed offer to be executive editor of the magazines.

One of the first competitions he won was the Junior Mr. Europe contest in 1965. He won Mr. Europe the following year, at age 19. He would go on to compete in many bodybuilding contests, and win most of them. His bodybuilding victories included five Mr. Universe wins (4 – NABBA [England], 1 – IFBB [USA]), and seven Mr. Olympia wins, a record which would stand until Lee Haney won his eighth consecutive Mr. Olympia title in 1991.

Schwarzenegger continues to work out. When asked about his personal training during the 2011 Arnold Classic he said that he was still working out a half an hour with weights every day.

Powerlifting/weightlifting 

During Schwarzenegger's early years in bodybuilding, he also competed in several Olympic weightlifting and powerlifting contests. Schwarzenegger's first professional competition was in 1963 and he won two weightlifting contests in 1964 and 1965, as well as two powerlifting contests in 1966 and 1968.

In 1967, Schwarzenegger won the Munich stone-lifting contest, in which a stone weighing 508 German pounds (254 kg / 560 lb) is lifted between the legs while standing on two footrests.

Personal records 

 Clean and press – 
 Snatch – 
 Clean and jerk – 
 Squat – 
 Bench press – 
 Deadlift –

Mr. Olympia 

Schwarzenegger's goal was to become the greatest bodybuilder in the world, which meant becoming Mr. Olympia. His first attempt was in 1969, when he lost to three-time champion Sergio Oliva. However, Schwarzenegger came back in 1970 and won the competition, making him the youngest ever Mr. Olympia at the age of 23, a record he still holds to this day.

He continued his winning streak in the 1971–1974 competitions. He also toured different countries selling vitamins, as in Helsinki, Finland in 1972, when he lived at the YMCA Hotel Hospiz (nowadays Hotel Arthur) on Vuorikatu and presented vitamin pills at the Stockmann shopping center. In 1975, Schwarzenegger was once again in top form, and won the title for the sixth consecutive time, beating Franco Columbu. After the 1975 Mr. Olympia contest, Schwarzenegger announced his retirement from professional bodybuilding.

Months before the 1975 Mr. Olympia contest, filmmakers George Butler and Robert Fiore persuaded Schwarzenegger to compete and film his training in the bodybuilding documentary called Pumping Iron. Schwarzenegger had only three months to prepare for the competition, after losing significant weight to appear in the film Stay Hungry with Jeff Bridges. Although significantly taller and heavier, Lou Ferrigno proved not to be a threat, and a lighter-than-usual Schwarzenegger convincingly won the 1975 Mr. Olympia.

Schwarzenegger came out of retirement, however, to compete in the 1980 Mr. Olympia. Schwarzenegger was training for his role in Conan, and he got into such good shape because of the running, horseback riding and sword training, that he decided he wanted to win the Mr. Olympia contest one last time. He kept this plan a secret in the event that a training accident would prevent his entry and cause him to lose face. Schwarzenegger had been hired to provide color commentary for network television when he announced at the eleventh hour that, while he was there, "Why not compete?" Schwarzenegger ended up winning the event with only seven weeks of preparation. Having been declared Mr. Olympia for a seventh time, Schwarzenegger then officially retired from competition. This victory (subject of the documentary The Comeback) was highly controversial, though, as fellow competitors and many observers felt that his lack of muscle mass (especially in his thighs) and subpar conditioning should have precluded him from winning against a very competitive lineup that year. Mike Mentzer, in particular, felt cheated and withdrew from competitive bodybuilding after that contest.

Steroid use 
Schwarzenegger has acknowledged using performance-enhancing anabolic steroids while they were legal, writing in 1977 that "steroids were helpful to me in maintaining muscle size while on a strict diet in preparation for a contest. I did not use them for muscle growth, but rather for muscle maintenance when cutting up." He has called the drugs "tissue building".

In 1999, Schwarzenegger sued Willi Heepe, a German doctor who publicly predicted his early death on the basis of a link between his steroid use and later heart problems. Since the doctor never examined him personally, Schwarzenegger collected a US$10,000 libel judgment against him in a German court. In 1999, Schwarzenegger also sued and settled with Globe, a U.S. tabloid which had made similar predictions about the bodybuilder's future health.

List of competitions

Statistics 

 Height: 
 Off-season weight: 
 Chest: 
 Waist: 
 Arms: 
 Thighs: 
 Calves:

Acting career

Early roles 

Schwarzenegger wanted to move from bodybuilding into acting, finally achieving it when he was chosen to play the title role in Hercules in New York (1970). Credited under the stage name "Arnold Strong", his accent in the film was so thick that his lines were dubbed after production. His second film appearance was as a mob hitman in The Long Goodbye (1973), which was followed by a much more significant part in the film Stay Hungry (1976), for which he won the Golden Globe Award for New Star of the Year – Actor. Schwarzenegger has discussed his early struggles in developing his acting career: "It was very difficult for me in the beginning – I was told by agents and casting people that my body was 'too weird', that I had a funny accent, and that my name was too long. You name it, and they told me I had to change it. Basically, everywhere I turned, I was told that I had no chance."

Schwarzenegger drew attention and boosted his profile in the bodybuilding film Pumping Iron (1977), elements of which were dramatized. In 1991, he purchased the rights to the film, its outtakes, and associated still photography. In 1977, he made guest appearances in single episodes of the ABC sitcom The San Pedro Beach Bums and the ABC police procedural The Streets of San Francisco. Schwarzenegger auditioned for the title role of The Incredible Hulk, but did not win the role because of his height. Later, Lou Ferrigno got the part of Dr. David Banner's alter ego. Schwarzenegger appeared with Kirk Douglas and Ann-Margret in the 1979 comedy The Villain. In 1980, he starred in a biographical film of the 1950s actress Jayne Mansfield as Mansfield's husband, Mickey Hargitay.

Action superstar 

Schwarzenegger's breakthrough film was the sword and sorcery epic Conan the Barbarian in 1982, which was a box-office hit. This was followed by a sequel, Conan the Destroyer, in 1984, although it was not as successful as its predecessor. In 1983, Schwarzenegger starred in the promotional video Carnival in Rio. In 1984, he made his first appearance as the eponymous character in James Cameron's science fiction action film The Terminator. It has been called his acting career's signature role. Following this, Schwarzenegger made another sword and sorcery film, Red Sonja, in 1985. During the 1980s, audiences had an appetite for action films, with both Schwarzenegger and Sylvester Stallone becoming international stars. During the Schwarzenegger-Stallone rivalry they attacked each other in the press, and tried to surpass the other with more on-screen killings and larger weapons. Schwarzenegger's roles reflected his sense of humor, separating him from more serious action hero films. He made a number of successful action films in the 1980s, such as Commando (1985), Raw Deal (1986), The Running Man (1987), Predator (1987), and Red Heat (1988).

Twins (1988), a comedy with Danny DeVito, also proved successful. Total Recall (1990) netted Schwarzenegger $10 million (equivalent to $ million today) and 15% of the film's gross. A science fiction script, the film was based on the Philip K. Dick short story "We Can Remember It for You Wholesale". Kindergarten Cop (1990) reunited him with director Ivan Reitman, who directed him in Twins. Schwarzenegger had a brief foray into directing, first with a 1990 episode of the TV series Tales from the Crypt, entitled "The Switch", and then with the 1992 telemovie Christmas in Connecticut. He has not directed since.

Schwarzenegger's commercial peak was his return as the title character in Terminator 2: Judgment Day (1991), which was the highest-grossing film of the year. Film critic Roger Ebert commented that "Schwarzenegger's genius as a movie star is to find roles that build on, rather than undermine, his physical and vocal characteristics." In 1993, the National Association of Theatre Owners named him the "International Star of the Decade". His next film project, the 1993 self-aware action comedy spoof Last Action Hero, was released opposite Jurassic Park, and did not do well at the box office. His next film, the comedy drama True Lies (1994), was a popular spy film and saw Schwarzenegger reunited with James Cameron.

That same year, the comedy Junior was released, the last of Schwarzenegger's three collaborations with Ivan Reitman and again co-starring Danny DeVito. This film brought him his second Golden Globe nomination, this time for Best Actor – Motion Picture Musical or Comedy. It was followed by the action thriller Eraser (1996), the Christmas comedy Jingle All The Way (1996), and the comic book-based Batman & Robin (1997), in which he played the villain Mr. Freeze. This was his final film before taking time to recuperate from a back injury. Following the critical failure of Batman & Robin, his film career and box office prominence went into decline. He returned with the supernatural thriller End of Days (1999), later followed by the action films The 6th Day (2000) and Collateral Damage (2002), both of which failed to do well at the box office. In 2003, he made his third appearance as the title character in Terminator 3: Rise of the Machines, which went on to earn over $150 million domestically (equivalent to $ million today).

In tribute to Schwarzenegger in 2002, Forum Stadtpark, a local cultural association, proposed plans to build a  Terminator statue in a park in central Graz. Schwarzenegger reportedly said he was flattered, but thought the money would be better spent on social projects and the Special Olympics.

Retirement 

His film appearances after becoming Governor of California included a three-second cameo appearance in The Rundown and the 2004 remake of Around the World in 80 Days. In 2005, he appeared as himself in the film The Kid & I. He voiced Baron von Steuben in the Liberty's Kids episode "Valley Forge". He had been rumored to be appearing in Terminator Salvation as the original T-800; he denied his involvement, but he ultimately did appear briefly via his image being inserted into the movie from stock footage of the first Terminator movie. Schwarzenegger appeared in Sylvester Stallone's The Expendables, where he made a cameo appearance.

Return to acting 

In January 2011, just weeks after leaving office in California, Schwarzenegger announced that he was reading several new scripts for future films, one of them being the World War II action drama With Wings as Eagles, written by Randall Wallace, based on a true story.

On March 6, 2011, at the Arnold Seminar of the Arnold Classic, Schwarzenegger revealed that he was being considered for several films, including sequels to The Terminator and remakes of Predator and The Running Man, and that he was "packaging" a comic book character. The character was later revealed to be the Governator, star of the comic book and animated series of the same name. Schwarzenegger inspired the character and co-developed it with Stan Lee, who would have produced the series. Schwarzenegger would have voiced the Governator.

On May 20, 2011, Schwarzenegger's entertainment counsel announced that all film projects currently in development were being halted: "Schwarzenegger is focusing on personal matters and is not willing to commit to any production schedules or timelines." On July 11, 2011, it was announced that Schwarzenegger was considering a comeback film, despite legal problems related to his divorce. He starred in The Expendables 2 (2012) as Trench Mauser, and starred in The Last Stand (2013), his first leading role in 10 years, and Escape Plan (2013), his first co-starring role alongside Sylvester Stallone. He starred in Sabotage, released in March 2014, and returned as Trench Mauser in The Expendables 3, released in August 2014. He starred in the fifth Terminator film Terminator Genisys in 2015, and would reprise his role as Conan the Barbarian in The Legend of Conan, later renamed Conan the Conqueror. However, in April 2017, producer Chris Morgan stated that Universal had dropped the project, although there was a possibility of a TV show. The story of the film was supposed to be set 30 years after the first, with some inspiration from Clint Eastwood's Unforgiven.

In August 2016, his filming of action-comedy Killing Gunther was temporarily interrupted by bank robbers near the filming location in Surrey, British Columbia. The film was released in September 2017. He was announced to star and produce in a film about the ruins of Sanxingdui called The Guest of Sanxingdui as an ambassador.

On February 6, 2018, Amazon Studios announced they were working with Schwarzenegger to develop a new series entitled Outrider in which he will star and executive produce. The western-drama set in the Oklahoma Indian Territory in the late 19th century will follow a deputy (portrayed by Schwarzenegger) who is tasked with apprehending a legendary outlaw in the wilderness, but is forced to partner with a ruthless Federal Marshal to make sure justice is properly served. The series will also mark as Schwarzenegger's first major scripted TV role.

Schwarzenegger returned to the Terminator franchise with Terminator: Dark Fate, which was released on November 1, 2019. It was produced by the series' co-creator James Cameron, who directed him previously in the first two films in the series and in True Lies. It was shot in Almería, Hungary and the US.

The Celebrity Apprentice 

In September 2015, the media announced that Schwarzenegger was to replace Donald Trump as host of The New Celebrity Apprentice. This show, the 15th season of The Apprentice, aired during the 2016–2017 TV season. In the show, he used the phrases "you're terminated" and "get to the choppa", which are quotes from some of his famous roles (The Terminator and Predator, respectively), when firing the contestants.

In March 2017, following repeated criticisms from Trump, Schwarzenegger announced that he would not return for another season on the show. He also reacted to Trump's remarks in January 2017 via Instagram: "Hey, Donald, I have a great idea. Why don't we switch jobs? You take over TV because you're such an expert in ratings, and I take over your job, and then people can finally sleep comfortably again."

Political career

Early politics 

Schwarzenegger has been a registered Republican for many years. When he was an actor, his political views were always well known as they contrasted with those of many other prominent Hollywood stars, who are generally considered to be a left-wing and Democratic-leaning community. At the 2004 Republican National Convention, Schwarzenegger gave a speech and explained that he was a Republican because he believed the Democrats of the 1960s sounded too much like Austrian socialists.

In 1985, Schwarzenegger appeared in "Stop the Madness", an anti-drug music video sponsored by the Reagan administration. He first came to wide public notice as a Republican during the 1988 presidential election, accompanying then–Vice President George H. W. Bush at a campaign rally.

Schwarzenegger famously introduced the first episode of the 1990 Milton Friedman hosted PBS series Free to Choose stating:  Schwarzenegger goes on to tell of how he and his then wife Maria Shriver were in Palm Springs preparing to play a game of mixed doubles when Milton Friedman's famous show came on the television. Schwarzenegger recalls that while watching Friedman's Free to Choose, Schwarzenegger, "...recognized Friedman from the study of my own degree in economics, but I didn't know I was watching Free to Choose... it knocked me out. Dr. Friedman expressed, validated and explained everything I ever thought or experienced or observed about the way the economy works, and I guess I was really ready to hear it." Numerous critics state that Schwarzenegger strayed from much of Friedman's economic ways of thinking in later years, especially upon being elected Governor of California from 2003 through 2011.

Schwarzenegger's first political appointment was as chairman of the President's Council on Physical Fitness and Sports, on which he served from 1990 to 1993. He was nominated by the then-President Bush, who dubbed him "Conan the Republican". He later served as chairman for the California Governor's Council on Physical Fitness and Sports under Governor Pete Wilson.

Between 1993 and 1994, Schwarzenegger was a Red Cross ambassador (a ceremonial role fulfilled by celebrities), recording several television and radio public service announcements to donate blood.

In an interview with Talk magazine in late 1999, Schwarzenegger was asked if he thought of running for office. He replied, "I think about it many times. The possibility is there because I feel it inside." The Hollywood Reporter claimed shortly after that Schwarzenegger sought to end speculation that he might run for governor of California. Following his initial comments, Schwarzenegger said, "I'm in show business – I am in the middle of my career. Why would I go away from that and jump into something else?"

Governor of California 

Schwarzenegger announced his candidacy in the 2003 California recall election for Governor of California on the August 6, 2003, episode of The Tonight Show with Jay Leno. Schwarzenegger had the most name recognition in a crowded field of candidates, but he had never held public office and his political views were unknown to most Californians. His candidacy immediately became national and international news, with media outlets dubbing him the "Governator" (referring to The Terminator movies, see above) and "The Running Man" (the name of another one of his films), and calling the recall election "Total Recall" (yet another movie starring Schwarzenegger). Schwarzenegger declined to participate in several debates with other recall replacement candidates, and appeared in only one debate on September 24, 2003.

On October 7, 2003, the recall election resulted in Governor Gray Davis being removed from office with 55.4% of the Yes vote in favor of a recall. Schwarzenegger was elected Governor of California under the second question on the ballot with 48.6% of the vote to choose a successor to Davis. Schwarzenegger defeated Democrat Cruz Bustamante, fellow Republican Tom McClintock, and others. His nearest rival, Bustamante, received 31% of the vote. In total, Schwarzenegger won the election by about 1.3 million votes. Under the regulations of the California Constitution, no runoff election was required. Schwarzenegger was the second foreign-born governor of California after Irish-born Governor John G. Downey in 1862.

Schwarzenegger is a moderate Republican. He says he is fiscally conservative and socially liberal. On the issue of abortion, he describes himself as pro-choice, but supports parental notification for minors and a ban on partial-birth abortion. He has supported gay rights, such as domestic partnerships, and he performed a same-sex marriage as governor. However, Schwarzenegger vetoed bills that would have legalized same-sex marriage in California in 2005 and 2007. He additionally vetoed two bills that would have implemented a single-payer health care system in California in 2006 and 2008, respectively.

Schwarzenegger was entrenched in what he considered to be his mandate in cleaning up political gridlock. Building on a catchphrase from the sketch "Hans and Franz" from Saturday Night Live (which partly parodied his bodybuilding career), Schwarzenegger called the Democratic State politicians "girlie men".

Schwarzenegger's early victories included repealing an unpopular increase in the vehicle registration fee as well as preventing driver's licenses from being given out to illegal immigrants, but later he began to feel the backlash when powerful state unions began to oppose his various initiatives. Key among his reckoning with political realities was a special election he called in November 2005, in which four ballot measures he sponsored were defeated. Schwarzenegger accepted personal responsibility for the defeats and vowed to continue to seek consensus for the people of California. He would later comment that "no one could win if the opposition raised 160 million dollars to defeat you". The U.S. Supreme Court later found the public employee unions' use of compulsory fundraising during the campaign had been illegal in Knox v. Service Employees International Union, Local 1000.

Schwarzenegger, against the advice of fellow Republican strategists, appointed a Democrat, Susan Kennedy, as his Chief of Staff. He gradually moved towards a more politically moderate position, determined to build a winning legacy with only a short time to go until the next gubernatorial election.

Schwarzenegger ran for re-election against Democrat Phil Angelides, the California State Treasurer, in the 2006 elections, held on November 7, 2006. Despite a poor year nationally for the Republican party, Schwarzenegger won re-election with 56.0% of the vote compared with 38.9% for Angelides, a margin of well over 1 million votes. Around this time, many commentators saw Schwarzenegger as moving away from the right and towards the center of the political spectrum. After hearing a speech by Schwarzenegger at the 2006 Martin Luther King Jr. Day breakfast, in which Schwarzenegger said, in part "How wrong I was when I said everyone has an equal opportunity to make it in America [...] the state of California does not provide (equal) education for all of our children", San Francisco mayor & future governor of California Gavin Newsom said that "[H]e's becoming a Democrat [... H]e's running back, not even to the center. I would say center-left".

Some speculated that Schwarzenegger might run for the United States Senate in 2010, as his governorship would be term-limited by that time. Such rumors turned out to be false.

Wendy Leigh, who wrote an unofficial biography on Schwarzenegger, claims he plotted his political rise from an early age using the movie business and bodybuilding as the means to escape a depressing home. Leigh portrays Schwarzenegger as obsessed with power and quotes him as saying, "I wanted to be part of the small percentage of people who were leaders, not the large mass of followers. I think it is because I saw leaders use 100% of their potential – I was always fascinated by people in control of other people." Schwarzenegger has said that it was never his intention to enter politics, but he says, "I married into a political family. You get together with them and you hear about policy, about reaching out to help people. I was exposed to the idea of being a public servant and Eunice and Sargent Shriver became my heroes." Eunice Kennedy Shriver was the sister of John F. Kennedy, and mother-in-law to Schwarzenegger; Sargent Shriver is husband to Eunice and father-in-law to Schwarzenegger.

Schwarzenegger cannot run for U.S. president as he is not a natural-born citizen of the United States. Schwarzenegger is a dual Austrian and United States citizen. He has held Austrian citizenship since birth and U.S. citizenship since becoming naturalized in 1983. Being Austrian and thus European, he was able to win the 2007 European Voice campaigner of the year award for taking action against climate change with the California Global Warming Solutions Act of 2006 and plans to introduce an emissions trading scheme with other US states and possibly with the EU.

Because of his personal wealth from his acting career, Schwarzenegger did not accept his governor's salary of $175,000 per year.

Schwarzenegger's endorsement in the Republican primary of the 2008 U.S. presidential election was highly sought; despite being good friends with candidates Rudy Giuliani and Senator John McCain, Schwarzenegger remained neutral throughout 2007 and early 2008. Giuliani dropped out of the presidential race on January 30, 2008, largely because of a poor showing in Florida, and endorsed McCain. Later that night, Schwarzenegger was in the audience at a Republican debate at the Ronald Reagan Presidential Library in California. The following day, he endorsed McCain, joking, "It's Rudy's fault!" (in reference to his friendships with both candidates and that he could not make up his mind). Schwarzenegger's endorsement was thought to be a boost for Senator McCain's campaign; both spoke about their concerns for the environment and economy.

In its April 2010 report, Progressive ethics watchdog group Citizens for Responsibility and Ethics in Washington named Schwarzenegger one of 11 "worst governors" in the United States because of various ethics issues throughout Schwarzenegger's term as governor.

Governor Schwarzenegger played a significant role in opposing Proposition 66, a proposed amendment of the Californian Three Strikes Law, in November 2004. This amendment would have required the third felony to be either violent or serious to mandate a 25-years-to-life sentence. In the last week before the ballot, Schwarzenegger launched an intense campaign against Proposition 66. He stated that "it would release 26,000 dangerous criminals and rapists".

Although he began his tenure as governor with record high approval ratings (as high as 65% in May 2004), he left office with a record low 23%, only one percent higher than that of Gray Davis, when he was recalled in October 2003.

Death of Luis Santos 

In May 2010, Esteban Núñez pleaded guilty to voluntary manslaughter and was sentenced to 16 years in prison for the death of Luis Santos. Núñez is the son of Fabian Núñez, then California Assembly Speaker of the House and a close friend and staunch political ally of then governor Schwarzenegger.

As a personal favor to "a friend", just hours before he left office, and as one of his last official acts, Schwarzenegger commuted Núñez's sentence by more than half, to seven years. He believed that Núñez's sentence was "excessive" in comparison with the same prison term imposed on Ryan Jett, the man who fatally stabbed Santos. Against protocol, Schwarzenegger did not inform Santos' family or the San Diego County prosecutors about the commutation. They learned about it in a call from a reporter.

The Santos family, along with the San Diego district attorney, sued to stop the commutation, claiming that it violated Marsy's Law. In September 2012, Sacramento County superior court judge Lloyd Connelly stated, "Based on the evidentiary records before this court involving this case, there was an abuse of discretion...This was a distasteful commutation. It was repugnant to the bulk of the citizenry of this state." However, Connelly ruled that Schwarzenegger remained within his executive powers as governor. Subsequently, as a direct result of the way the commutation was handled, Governor Jerry Brown signed a bipartisan bill that allows offenders' victims and their families to be notified at least 10 days before any commutations. Núñez was released from prison after serving less than six years.

Drug use and allegations of sexual misconduct 

During his initial campaign for governor in 2003, allegations of sexual and personal misconduct were raised against Schwarzenegger. Within the last five days before the election, news reports appeared in the Los Angeles Times recounting decades-old allegations of sexual misconduct from six individual women. Schwarzenegger responded to the allegations in 2004 admitting that he has "behaved badly sometimes" and apologized, but also stated that "a lot of [what] you see in the stories is not true". One of the women who came forward was British television personality Anna Richardson, who settled a libel lawsuit in August 2006 against Schwarzenegger; his top aide, Sean Walsh; and his publicist, Sheryl Main. A joint statement read: "The parties are content to put this matter behind them and are pleased that this legal dispute has now been settled."

During this time a 1977 interview in adult magazine Oui gained attention, in which Schwarzenegger discussed using substances such as marijuana. Schwarzenegger is shown smoking a marijuana joint after winning Mr. Olympia in 1975 in the documentary film Pumping Iron (1977). In an interview with GQ magazine in October 2007, Schwarzenegger said, "[Marijuana] is not a drug. It's a leaf. My drug was pumping iron, trust me." His spokesperson later said the comment was meant to be a joke.

Citizenship 

Schwarzenegger became a naturalized U.S. citizen on September 17, 1983. Shortly before he gained his citizenship, he asked the Austrian authorities for the right to keep his Austrian citizenship, as Austria does not usually allow dual citizenship. His request was granted, and he retained his Austrian citizenship. In 2005, Peter Pilz, a member of the Austrian Parliament from the Austrian Green Party, unsuccessfully advocated for Parliament to revoke Schwarzenegger's Austrian citizenship due to his decision not to prevent the executions of Donald Beardslee and Stanley Williams. Pilz argued that Schwarzenegger caused damage to Austria's reputation in the international community because Austria abolished the death penalty in 1968. Pilz based his argument on Article 33 of the Austrian Citizenship Act, which states: "A citizen, who is in the public service of a foreign country, shall be deprived of his citizenship if he heavily damages the reputation or the interests of the Austrian Republic." Pilz claimed that Schwarzenegger's actions in support of the death penalty (prohibited in Austria under Protocol 13 of the European Convention on Human Rights) had damaged Austria's reputation. Schwarzenegger explained his actions by pointing out that his only duty as Governor of California with respect to the death penalty was to correct an error by the justice system by pardon or clemency if such an error had occurred.

Environmental record 

On September 27, 2006, Schwarzenegger signed the Global Warming Solutions Act of 2006, creating the nation's first cap on greenhouse gas emissions. The law set new regulations on the amount of emissions utilities, refineries, and manufacturing plants are allowed to release into the atmosphere. Schwarzenegger also signed a second global warming bill that prohibits large utilities and corporations in California from making long-term contracts with suppliers who do not meet the state's greenhouse gas emission standards. The two bills are part of a plan to reduce California's emissions by 25 percent to 1990s levels by 2020. In 2005, Schwarzenegger issued an executive order calling to reduce greenhouse gases to 80 percent below 1990 levels by 2050.

Schwarzenegger signed another executive order on October 17, 2006, allowing California to work with the Northeast's Regional Greenhouse Gas Initiative. They plan to reduce carbon dioxide emissions by issuing a limited amount of carbon credits to each power plant in participating states. Any power plants that exceed emissions for the number of carbon credits will have to purchase more credits to cover the difference. The plan took effect in 2009. In addition to using his political power to fight global warming, the governor has taken steps at his home to reduce his personal carbon footprint. Schwarzenegger has adapted one of his Hummers to run on hydrogen and another to run on biofuels. He has also installed solar panels to heat his home.

In respect for his contribution to the direction of the US motor industry, Schwarzenegger was invited to open the 2009 SAE World Congress in Detroit on April 20, 2009.

In 2011, Schwarzenegger founded the R20 Regions of Climate Action to develop a sustainable, low-carbon economy. In 2017, he joined French President Emmanuel Macron in calling for the adoption of a Global Pact for the Environment.
In 2017, Schwarzenegger launched the Austrian World Summit, an international climate conference that is held annually in Vienna, Austria. The Austrian World Summit is organized by the Schwarzenegger Climate Initiative and aims is to bring together representatives from politics, civil society and business to create a broad alliance for climate protection and to identify concrete solutions to the climate crisis.

Electoral history

Presidential ambitions 

Presidential aspirations by the Austrian-born Schwarzenegger would be blocked by a constitutional hurdle; Article II, Section I, Clause V prevents individuals who are not natural-born citizens of the United States from assuming the office. The Equal Opportunity to Govern Amendment in 2003 was widely accredited as the "Amend for Arnold" bill, which would have added an amendment to the U.S. Constitution allowing his run. In 2004, the "Amend for Arnold" campaign was launched, featuring a website and TV advertising promotion.

In June 2007, Schwarzenegger was featured on the cover of Time magazine with Michael Bloomberg, and subsequently, the two joked about a presidential ticket together.

In October 2013, the New York Post reported that Schwarzenegger was exploring a future run for president. At the time he had reportedly been lobbying legislators about a possible constitutional change, or filing a legal challenge to the requirement that presidents be native-born. Columbia University law professor Michael Dorf observed that Schwarzenegger's possible lawsuit could ultimately win him the right to run for the office, noting, "The law is very clear, but it's not 100 percent clear that the courts would enforce that law rather than leave it to the political process."

Business career 
Schwarzenegger has had enjoyed a highly successful business career. Following his move to the United States, Schwarzenegger became a "prolific goal setter" and would write his objectives at the start of the year on index cards, like starting a mail order business or buying a new car – and succeed in doing so. As a result of his early business and investment success, Schwarzenegger became a millionaire by the age of 25, well before making a name for himself in Hollywood. His financial independence came from his success as a entrepreneur and investor with a series of lucrative business ventures and real estate investments.

Early ventures
In 1968, Schwarzenegger and fellow bodybuilder Franco Columbu started a bricklaying business. The business flourished thanks to the pair's marketing savvy and an increased demand following the 1971 San Fernando earthquake. As a result of the businesses profitability, Schwarzenegger and Columbu rolled over the profits from their bricklaying venture to start a mail-order business that sold bodybuilding and fitness-related equipment and instructional tapes.

Investments 
Schwarzenegger transferred profits from the mail-order business and his bodybuilding-competition winnings by rolling the proceeds into his first real estate investment: an apartment building he purchased for $10,000. With the handsome profits that he raked in over the years in real estate investing, Schwarzenegger would later go on to invest in a number of real estate holding companies.

Stallone] and Schwarzenegger ended their longtime industry rivalry by both investing in the Planet Hollywood chain of international theme restaurants (modeled after the Hard Rock Cafe) along with Bruce Willis and Demi Moore. However, Schwarzenegger severed his financial ties with the business in early 2000. Schwarzenegger said the company did not have the success he had hoped for, claiming he wanted to focus his attention on "new US global business ventures" and his then-burgeoning acting career. 

Schwarzenegger also made a private investment in the Easton Town Center, a shopping mall located in Columbus, Ohio. He has talked about some of those who have helped him over the years in business: "I couldn't have learned about business without a parade of teachers guiding me... from Milton Friedman to Donald Trump... and now, Les Wexner and Warren Buffett. I even learned a thing or two from Planet Hollywood, such as when to get out! And I did!" He has significant equity ownership in Dimensional Fund Advisors, an Austin-based investment firm. Schwarzenegger is also the owner of Arnold's Sports Festival, a sports and fitness festival which he started in 1989 and is held annually in Columbus, Ohio. It is a festival that hosts thousands of international health and fitness professionals which has also expanded into a three-day expo. He also owns a film production company called Oak Productions, Inc. and Fitness Publications, a joint publishing venture with Simon & Schuster.

In 2018, Schwarzenegger partnered with basketball player LeBron James to establish Ladder, a company that developed nutritional supplements to help athletes with severe cramps. The duo sold Ladder to Openfit for an undisclosed amount in 2020 after reporting more than $4 million in sales for that year.

Restaurant 
In 1992, Schwarzenegger and his wife opened a restaurant in Santa Monica called Schatzi On Main. Schatzi literally means "little treasure," and colloquially "honey" or "darling" in German. In 1998, he sold his restaurant.

Wealth 

Schwarzenegger's net worth had been conservatively estimated at $100 million to $200 million. After separating from his wife, Maria Shriver, in 2011, it was estimated that his net worth had been approximately $400 million, and even as high as $800 million, based on tax returns he filed in 2006. Over the years, he invested his bodybuilding and film earnings in an array of stocks, bonds, privately controlled companies, and real estate holdings worldwide, making his net worth difficult to accurately estimate, particularly in light of declining real estate values owing to economic recessions in the United States and Europe that occurred during the late 2000s. In June 1997, he spent $38 million of his own money on a private Gulfstream jet. Schwarzenegger once quipped regarding his private fortune, "Money doesn't make you happy. I now have $50 million, but I was just as happy when I had $48 million."

Commercial advertisements 
Schwarzenegger has also appeared in a series of commercials for the Machine Zone game Mobile Strike as a military commander and spokesman.

Personal life

Early relationships 

In 1969, Schwarzenegger met Barbara Outland (later Barbara Outland Baker), an English teacher with whom he lived until 1974. Schwarzenegger said of Baker in his 1977 memoir, "Basically it came down to this: she was a well-balanced woman who wanted an ordinary, solid life, and I was not a well-balanced man, and hated the very idea of ordinary life." Baker has described Schwarzenegger as a "joyful personality, totally charismatic, adventurous, and athletic" but claims that towards the end of the relationship he became "insufferable—classically conceited—the world revolved around him". Baker published her memoir in 2006, entitled Arnold and Me: In the Shadow of the Austrian Oak. Although Baker painted an unflattering portrait of her former lover at times, Schwarzenegger actually contributed to the tell-all book with a foreword, and also met with Baker for three hours.

Baker claims that she only learned of his being unfaithful after they split, and talks of a turbulent and passionate love life. Schwarzenegger has made it clear that their respective recollection of events can differ. The couple first met six to eight months after his arrival in the U.S. Their first date was watching the first Apollo Moon landing on television. They shared an apartment in Santa Monica, California, for three and a half years, and having little money, they would visit the beach all day or have barbecues in the back yard. Although Baker claims that when she first met Schwarzenegger, he had "little understanding of polite society" and she found him a turn-off, she says, "He's as much a self-made man as it's possible to be—he never got encouragement from his parents, his family, his brother. He just had this huge determination to prove himself, and that was very attractive ... I'll go to my grave knowing Arnold loved me."

Schwarzenegger met his next lover, Beverly Hills hairdresser's assistant Sue Moray, on Venice Beach in July 1977. According to Moray, the couple led an open relationship: "We were faithful when we were both in LA... but when he was out of town, we were free to do whatever we wanted." Schwarzenegger met television journalist Maria Shriver, niece of President John F. Kennedy, at the Robert F. Kennedy Tennis Tournament in August 1977. He went on to have a relationship with both Moray and Shriver until August 1978 when Moray (who knew of his relationship with Shriver) issued an ultimatum.

Marriage and family 

On April 26, 1986, Schwarzenegger married Shriver in Hyannis, Massachusetts. They have four children, including Katherine Schwarzenegger and Patrick Schwarzenegger. All of their children were born in Los Angeles. The family lived in an  home in the Brentwood neighborhood of Los Angeles, California, with vacation homes in Sun Valley, Idaho, and Hyannis Port, Massachusetts. They attended St. Monica's Catholic Church.

Divorce 

On May 9, 2011, Shriver and Schwarzenegger ended their relationship after 25 years of marriage with Shriver moving out of their Brentwood mansion. On May 16, 2011, the Los Angeles Times revealed that Schwarzenegger had fathered a son more than 14 years earlier with an employee in their household, Mildred Patricia "Patty" Baena. "After leaving the governor's office I told my wife about this event, which occurred over a decade ago," Schwarzenegger said to the Times. In the statement, Schwarzenegger did not mention that he had confessed to his wife only after she had confronted him with the information, which she had done after confirming with the housekeeper what she had suspected about the child.

Baena is of Guatemalan origin. She was employed by the family for 20 years and retired in January 2011. The pregnant Baena was working in the home while Shriver was pregnant with the youngest of the couple's four children. Baena's son with Schwarzenegger was born days after Shriver gave birth. Schwarzenegger said that it took seven or eight years before he found out that he had fathered a child with his housekeeper. It was not until the boy "started looking like [him] ... that [he] put things together". Schwarzenegger has taken financial responsibility for the child "from the start and continued to provide support". KNX 1070 radio reported that, in 2010, he bought a new four-bedroom house with a pool for Baena and their son in Bakersfield, California. Baena separated from her husband, Rogelio, a few months after Joseph's birth. She filed for divorce in 2008. Rogelio said that the child's birth certificate was falsified and that he planned to sue Schwarzenegger for engaging in conspiracy to falsify a public document, a serious crime in California.

Pursuant to the divorce judgment, Schwarzenegger kept the Brentwood home, while Shriver purchased a new home nearby so that the children could travel between their parents' homes. They shared custody of the two youngest children. Schwarzenegger came under fire after the initial petition did not include spousal support and a reimbursement of attorney's fees. However, he claims this was not intentional and that he signed the initial documents without having properly read them. He filed amended divorce papers remedying this. Schwarzenegger and Shriver finalized their divorce in 2021, ten years after separating.

In June 2022, a jury ruled that Maria Shriver was entitled to half of her ex-husband's post-divorce savings that he earned from 1986 to 2011, including a pension.

After the scandal, Danish-Italian actress Brigitte Nielsen came forward and stated that she too had an affair with Schwarzenegger during the production of Red Sonja, while he had just started his relationship with Shriver. When asked in January 2014, "Of all the things you are famous for ... which are you least proud of?" Schwarzenegger replied, "I'm least proud of the mistakes I made that caused my family pain and split us up."

Accidents, injuries, and other health problems

Health problems 

Schwarzenegger was born with a bicuspid aortic valve, an aortic valve with only two leaflets, where a normal aortic valve has three. He opted in 1997 for a replacement heart valve made from his own pulmonic valve, which itself was replaced with a cadaveric pulmonic valve, in a Ross procedure; medical experts predicted he would require pulmonic heart valve replacement surgery within the next two to eight years because his valve would progressively degrade. Schwarzenegger apparently opted against a mechanical valve, the only permanent solution available at the time of his surgery, because it would have sharply limited his physical activity and capacity to exercise.

On March 29, 2018, Schwarzenegger underwent emergency open-heart surgery for replacement of his replacement pulmonic valve. He said about his recovery: "I underwent open-heart surgery this spring, I had to use a walker. I had to do breathing exercises five times a day to retrain my lungs. I was frustrated and angry, and in my worst moments, I couldn't see the way back to my old self."

In 2020, 23 years after his first surgery, Schwarzenegger underwent a surgery for a new aortic valve.

Accidents, injuries 

On December 9, 2001, he broke six ribs and was hospitalized for four days after a motorcycle crash in Los Angeles.

Schwarzenegger saved a drowning man in 2004 while on vacation in Hawaii by swimming out and bringing him back to shore.

On January 8, 2006, while Schwarzenegger was riding his Harley Davidson motorcycle in Los Angeles with his son Patrick in the sidecar, another driver backed into the street he was riding on, causing him and his son to collide with the car at a low speed. While his son and the other driver were unharmed, Schwarzenegger sustained an injury to his lip requiring 15 stitches. "No citations were issued," said Officer Jason Lee, a Los Angeles Police Department spokesman. Schwarzenegger did not obtain his motorcycle license until July 3, 2006.

Schwarzenegger tripped over his ski pole and broke his right femur while skiing in Sun Valley, Idaho, with his family on December 23, 2006. On December 26, he underwent a 90-minute operation in which cables and screws were used to wire the broken bone back together. He was released from St. John's Health Center on December 30, 2006.

Schwarzenegger's private jet made an emergency landing at Van Nuys Airport on June 19, 2009, after the pilot reported smoke coming from the cockpit, according to a statement released by his press secretary. No one was harmed in the incident.

On May 18, 2019, while on a visit to South Africa, Schwarzenegger was attacked and dropkicked from behind by an unknown malefactor while giving autographs to his fans at one of the local schools. Despite the surprise and unprovoked nature of the attack, he reportedly suffered no injuries and continued to interact with fans. The attacker was apprehended and Schwarzenegger declined to press charges against him.

Schwarzenegger was involved in a multi-vehicle collision on the afternoon of Friday, January 21, 2022. Schwarzenegger was driving a black GMC Yukon SUV near the intersections of Sunset Blvd and Allenford Ave in the Brentwood neighborhood of Los Angeles, when his vehicle collided with a red Toyota Prius. The driver of the Prius was transported to the hospital for injuries sustained to her head. Schwarzenegger was uninjured.

Height 

Schwarzenegger's official height of  has been brought into question by several articles. During his bodybuilding days in the late 1960s, it was claimed that he measured . However, in 1988, both the Daily Mail and Time Out magazine mentioned that Schwarzenegger appeared noticeably shorter. Prior to running for governor, Schwarzenegger's height was once again questioned in an article by the Chicago Reader. As governor, Schwarzenegger engaged in a light-hearted exchange with Assemblyman Herb Wesson over their heights. At one point, Wesson made an unsuccessful attempt to, in his own words, "settle this once and for all and find out how tall he is" by using a tailor's tape measure on the Governor. Schwarzenegger retaliated by placing a pillow stitched with the words "Need a lift?" on the  Wesson's chair before a negotiating session in his office.

Autobiography 

Schwarzenegger's autobiography, Total Recall, was released in October 2012. He devotes one chapter called "The Secret" to his extramarital affair. The majority of his book is about his successes in the three major chapters in his life: bodybuilder, actor, and Governor of California.

Vehicles 

Growing up during the Allied occupation of Austria, Schwarzenegger commonly saw heavy military vehicles such as tanks as a child. As a result, he paid $20,000 to bring his Austrian Army M47 Patton tank (331) to the United States, which he previously operated during his mandatory service in 1965. However, he later obtained his vehicle in 1991/2, during his tenure as the Chairmen of the President's Council on Sports, Fitness, and Nutrition, and now uses it to support his charity. His first car ever was an Opel Kadett in 1969 after serving in the Austrian army, then he rode a Harley-Davidson Fat Boy in 1991.

Moreover, he came to develop an interest in large vehicles and became the first civilian in the U.S. to purchase a Humvee. He was so enamored by the vehicle that he lobbied the Humvee's manufacturer, AM General, to produce a street-legal, civilian version, which they did in 1992; the first two Hummer H1s they sold were also purchased by Schwarzenegger. In 2010, he had one regular and three running on non-fossil power sources; one for hydrogen, one for vegetable oil, and one for biodiesel. Schwarzenegger was in the news in 2014 for buying a rare Bugatti Veyron Grand Sport Vitesse. He was spotted and filmed in 2015 in his car, painted silver with bright aluminum forged wheels. His Bugatti has its interior adorned in dark brown leather. In 2017, Schwarzenegger acquired a Mercedes G-Class modified for all-electric drive.

During the gubernatorial recall campaign, he announced that he would convert one of his Hummers to burn hydrogen. The conversion was reported to have cost about $21,000. After the election, he signed an executive order to jump-start the building of hydrogen refueling plants called the California Hydrogen Highway Network, and gained a U.S. Department of Energy grant to help pay for its projected US$91,000,000 cost. California took delivery of the first H2H (Hydrogen Hummer) in October 2004.

Public image and legacy 

Schwarzenegger has been involved with the Special Olympics for many years after they were founded by his ex-mother-in-law Eunice Kennedy Shriver. In 2007, Schwarzenegger was the official spokesperson for the Special Olympics held in Shanghai, China. Schwarzenegger believes that quality school opportunities should be made available to children who might not normally be able to access them. In 1995, he founded the Inner City Games Foundation (ICG) which provides cultural, educational and community enrichment programming to youth. ICG is active in 15 cities around the country and serves over 250,000 children in over 400 schools countrywide. He has also been involved with After-School All-Stars and founded the Los Angeles branch in 2002. ASAS is an after school program provider, educating youth about health, fitness and nutrition.

On February 12, 2010, Schwarzenegger took part in the Vancouver Olympic Torch relay. He handed off the flame to the next runner, Sebastian Coe.

Schwarzenegger had a collection of Marxist busts, which he requested from Russian friends during the dissolution of the Soviet Union, as they were being destroyed. In 2011, he revealed that his wife had requested their removal, but he kept the one of Vladimir Lenin present, since "he was the first". In 2015, he said he kept the Lenin bust to "show losers".

Schwarzenegger is a supporter of Israel, and has participated in a Los Angeles pro-Israel rally among other similar events. In 2004, Schwarzenegger visited Israel to break ground on Simon Wiesenthal Center's Museum of Tolerance Jerusalem, and to lay a wreath at the Yad Vashem Holocaust Memorial, he also met with Prime Minister Ariel Sharon and President Moshe Katsav. In 2011, at the Independence Day celebration hosted by the Israeli Consulate General in Los Angeles, Schwarzenegger said: "I love Israel. When I became governor, Israel was the first country that I visited. When I had the chance to sign a bill calling on California pension funds to divest their money from companies that do business with Iran, I immediately signed that bill", then he added, "I knew that we could not send money to these crazy dictators who hate us and threaten Israel any time they have a bad day."

Schwarzenegger supported the 2003 invasion of Iraq. Schwarzenegger also expressed support for the 2011 military intervention in Libya. In 2014, Schwarzenegger released a video message in support of the Euromaidan protests against Ukraine's pro-Russian President Viktor Yanukovych. In 2022, Schwarzenegger released another video message condemning the 2022 Russian invasion of Ukraine. Schwarzenegger's Twitter account is one of the 22 accounts that the president of Russia's Twitter account follows.

Schwarzenegger, who played football as a boy, grew up watching Bayern Munich and Sturm Graz. He also expressed his admiration of Jürgen Klopp's Liverpool in October 2019.

Schwarzenegger inspired many actors to become action heroes, including Dwayne Johnson, Matt McColm, Christian Boeving, Vidyut Jamwal, and Daniel Greene. Boeving's character in the 2003 action film When Eagles Strike was based on Schwarzenegger's image from the late 1980s: mostly on Major "Dutch" Schaefer from Predator (1987) and Colonel John Matrix from Commando (1985). In 2022, Schwarzenegger's use of a shotgun in the Terminator film series was referenced by actor Vijay in the Indian film Beast.

Schwarzenegger Institute for State and Global Policy 

In 2012, Schwarzenegger helped to found the Schwarzenegger Institute for State and Global Policy, which is a part of the USC Price School of Public Policy at the University of Southern California. The institute's mission is to "[advance] post-partisanship, where leaders put people over political parties and work together to find the best ideas and solutions to benefit the people they serve" and to "seek to influence public policy and public debate in finding solutions to the serious challenges we face". Schwarzenegger serves as chairman of the institute.

Global warming 

At a 2015 security conference, Schwarzenegger called climate change the issue of our time. He also urged politicians to stop treating climate change as a political issue.

2016 presidential election 

For the 2016 Republican Party presidential primaries, Schwarzenegger endorsed fellow Republican John Kasich. However, he announced in October that he would not vote for the Republican presidential candidate Donald Trump in that year's United States presidential election, with this being the first time he did not vote for the Republican candidate since becoming a citizen in 1983.

Post-2016 

In recent years, Schwarzenegger has been advocating for eating less meat, and he is an executive producer alongside James Cameron et al. behind the documentary The Game Changers, that documents the explosive rise of plant-based eating in professional sports, in which he is also featured.

In 2017, Schwarzenegger condemned white supremacists who were seen carrying Nazi and Confederate flags by calling their heroes "losers".

In 2019, while at the "Arnold Classic Africa" sports competition as an official, Schwarzenegger was attacked by an assailant in a flying kick. The assailant was arrested.

Following the January 6 United States Capitol attack by supporters of President Donald Trump, Schwarzenegger posted a video address on social media in which he likened the insurrection to Nazi Germany's Kristallnacht, which he described as "a night of rampage against the Jews carried out [by] the Nazi equivalent of the Proud Boys". He spoke of his father's alcoholism, domestic violence, and abuse, and how it was typical of other former Nazis and collaborators in the post-war era; and described Trump as "a failed leader. He will go down in history as the worst president ever."

In late March 2021, Schwarzenegger was interviewed by Politico about the upcoming recall election in California in which he said that "it's pretty much the same atmosphere today as it was then", and when he was asked about Newsom's claim of this being a "Republican recall" he responded that "this recall effort is sparked by ordinary folks", and that this was not a power grab by Republicans.

Schwarzenegger has spoken out about COVID-19, urging Americans to wear masks and practice social distancing. In August 2021, he said: "There is a virus here. It kills people and the only way we prevent it is: get vaccinated, wear masks, do social distancing, washing your hands all the time, and not just to think about, 'Well my freedom is being kind of disturbed here.' No, screw your freedom."

In February 2022, Schwarzenegger said his diet has been mostly vegan for the past five years, saying it was about 80% plant-based food. He has been outspoken about the benefits of a vegan diet for health and said it had helped him feel "healthier and younger overall". He also credited it to helping him lower his cholesterol.

Filmography

Awards and honors 

 Seven-time Mr. Olympia winner
 Four-time Mr. Universe winner
 1969 World Amateur Bodybuilding Champion
 1977 Golden Globe Award winner
Medal for Humanitary Merit of the Austrian Albert Schweitzer Society (2011)
 Star on the Hollywood Walk of Fame
International Sports Hall of Fame (class of 2012)
Public art mural portrait "Arnold Schwarzenegger" (2012) by Jonas Never, Venice, Los Angeles
 WWE Hall of Fame (class of 2015)
 Schwarzenegger Institute for State and Global Policy (part of the USC Price School of Public Policy at the University of Southern California) named in his honor.
 Arnold's Run ski trail at Sun Valley Resort named in his honor. The trail is categorized as a black diamond, or most difficult, for its terrain.
 "A Day for Arnold" on July 30, 2007, in Thal, Austria. For his 60th birthday, the mayor sent Schwarzenegger the enameled address sign (Thal 145) of the house where Schwarzenegger was born, declaring "This belongs to him. No one here will ever be assigned that number again".
 Inkpot Award
 2014 Primetime Emmy Award winner for producing the documentary series Years of Living Dangerously

Government orders and decorations 

 Grand Decoration of Honour for Services to the Republic of Austria in Gold (1993)
 Cavalier (2011) and Commander (2017) of the French Legion of Honor
 Honorary Ring of the Federal State of Styria (Austria, June 2017)

Books

See also 

 Genealogy of the Kennedy family
 List of U.S. state governors born outside the United States

References

Footnotes

Citations

Further reading

External links 

 
 Schwarzenegger Museum
 
 
 
 
 
 

|-

|-

|-

|-

|-

 
1947 births
Living people
20th-century American businesspeople
20th-century American male actors
20th-century American male writers
20th-century American non-fiction writers
20th-century Austrian businesspeople
20th-century Austrian male actors
20th-century Austrian male writers
20th-century Austrian writers
20th-century Roman Catholics
21st-century American businesspeople
21st-century American male actors
21st-century American male writers
21st-century American non-fiction writers
21st-century American politicians
21st-century Austrian businesspeople
21st-century Austrian male actors
21st-century Austrian male writers
21st-century Austrian politicians
21st-century Austrian writers
21st-century Roman Catholics
Activists from California
Actors from Graz
Austrian autobiographers
American actor-politicians
American athlete-politicians
American autobiographers
American bodybuilders
American businesspeople in retailing
American education writers
American exercise and fitness writers
American film producers
American health activists
American instructional writers
American investors
American male film actors
American male non-fiction writers
American male television actors
American male video game actors
American male voice actors
American male weightlifters
American philanthropists
American powerlifters
American publishers (people)
American real estate businesspeople
American restaurateurs
American Roman Catholics
American stock traders
Austrian bodybuilders
Austrian emigrants to the United States
Austrian expatriate male actors in the United States
Austrian expatriate sportspeople in the United States
Austrian film directors
Austrian film producers
Austrian health activists
Austrian investors
Austrian male film actors
Austrian male television actors
Austrian male voice actors
Austrian male weightlifters
Austrian non-fiction writers
Austrian philanthropists
Austrian powerlifters
Austrian publishers (people)
Austrian real estate businesspeople
Austrian restaurateurs
Austrian Roman Catholics
Austrian soldiers
Businesspeople from Graz
Businesspeople from Los Angeles
Catholics from California
Commandeurs of the Légion d'honneur
Film directors from Los Angeles
Film producers from California
Republican Party governors of California
Inkpot Award winners
Kennedy family
Laureus World Sports Awards winners
Male actors from California
Male actors from Los Angeles
Male bodybuilders
New Star of the Year (Actor) Golden Globe winners
People from Brentwood, Los Angeles
People with acquired American citizenship
People with congenital heart defects
Politicians from Graz
Politicians from Los Angeles
Primetime Emmy Award winners
Santa Monica College alumni
Schwarzenegger family
Shriver family
Skydance Media people
Sportspeople from Graz
Sportspeople from Los Angeles
University of California regents
University of Wisconsin–Superior alumni
Writers from Graz
Writers from Los Angeles
WWE Hall of Fame inductees